New York-based rock band American Authors have released 4 studio albums, 7 EPs, and 16 singles, 8 of which were promotional singles, in their 13-year tenure as a band. Their discography also includes 19 music videos, 3 headlining tours, and three supporting tours for OneRepublic, The Fray, and The Revivalists respectively.

The band's first EP and first two studio albums recorded under the name American Authors have been major label releases on Universal Music Group subsidiary, Island Records. However, much of the band's early material was released independently under the name The Blue Pages.

Albums

Studio albums

Extended plays 
as The Blue Pages

as American Authors

Singles

As lead artist

As featured artist

Promotional singles

Videos

Music videos

Tours
Three of Clubs Tour (2013)
13th Annual Honda Civic Tours (2014)
What We Live For Europe Spring Tour (2017)
Co-headlining
The Mighty O.A.R. Summer Tour (2019) 
Supporting
Native Summer Tour (2014) 
North America Tour (2016) 
Take Good Care Tour (2019)

References

Discographies of American artists